Orbit Showtime Network (OSN), branded as OSN Group is a multinational premium entertainment content company based in Dubai, serving the Middle East and North Africa (MENA). OSN Group delivers content across multiple divisions: OSN+ streaming platform (or OSN Plus), OSN TV linear satellite channels, and b2b offerings in every market. OSN Group offers premium content, including Western, Arabic, Turkish, and more, across divisions and is known for broadcasting the latest content on the same day as the US, including popular series, blockbuster movies, and the best in kids and lifestyle programming. OSN was formed due to the merger of two of the Mideast's largest TV networks from homes and hotels, Orbit and Showtime Arabia, in 2009.

OSN introduced several technologies and services in the Middle East market. In 2012 the OSN DVR HD was launched. OSN Play, an online TV platform; Plus HD, a 3D, HD, internet-enabled satellite receiver and recorder and OSN on Demand, the region's first VOD service were all launched in the same year.

History of the Channel

Orbit Showtime Network (OSN) was created by the merger of the two largest pay-TV operators in the Middle East: Orbit Communications Company – a member of Riyadh-based Mawarid Holdings, and Showtime Arabia – a subsidiary of Kuwait-based KIPCO. [7] Showtime Arabia was launched in 1996 as a joint venture between KIPCO (79%) and CBS Corporation (21%), and six years after its launch became the number one satellite television platform in MENA. Showtime Arabia continued its growth in the region by adding a range of new channels and new services, such as the “Showbox DVR’ System in 2005, allowing subscribers to record different programmes. In 2008, Showtime Arabia also introduced a video-on-demand service, broadcasting full seasons of premier U.S. series and top Hollywood movies.[8] Bahrain-based Orbit was the first pay TV service in the Middle East; a challenging environment —from rampant piracy to a stubbornly low subscriber base— drove it to consolidate with the larger Showtime to better compete with popular free-to-air satellite television.[9]

On 6 April 2020, OSN unveiled a new logo after 11 years.

OSN+ (OSN Plus) 

In March 2022, OSN Streaming, the company’s streaming service, which launched in early 2020, became OSN+ (or OSN Plus) in a significant effort to refocus its subscription video-on-demand (SVOD) service in the region. The rebrand saw the app’s design overhauling the group’s traditional red logo in favour of a more colourful aesthetic. It also featured a refreshed interface and an enhanced search engine. OSN said the app marked “a new chapter” for the company since it embraces opportunities presented by the growing subscription video-on-demand landscape in the Middle East and North Africa.

The platform continued to provide content from long-standing global partners, including HBO, Paramount, and NBCUniversal, deepening its exclusive partnerships with leading studios. In January 2022, OSN announced the extension of its exclusive partnership with HBO, as well as an expansion of its NBCU relationship to include more premium television exclusives and box sets from Peacock and Sky Studios.  Announcements of new deals for premium series from Endeavour Content and All3Media also followed, supplementing existing partnerships with Paramount, Warner Bros. Discovery, Sony, MGM, and Lionsgate.  

In addition to a strong selection of international content, OSN+ (or OSN Plus) continues to provide Arabic offerings produced locally by talent from the region. The platform is investing significantly in the development of local and original features, with the first OSN+ Original series, a local adaptation of the American series Suits, launched in April 2022.

Technology 
OSN has launched 2 multi-function interactive decoders:
 OSN Plus HD
 OSN HD

Channels 
Movies:
OSN Movies Premiere
OSN Movies Premiere +2
OSN Movies Hollywood
OSN Movies Action
Star Movies HD

 Kids & Family:
OSN Family
OSN Kids
OSN Kidzone
Nicktoons
Nickelodeon
Nick Jr.
Disney Channel HD
Disney Junior
BabyTV
Moonbug Kids

General Entertainment:
OSN Showcase
OSN W
OSN Series Prime
OSN Comedy
OSN Pop Up
Star World HD

Arabic:
OSN ياهلا
OSN ياهلا بالعربي
OSN ياهلا أفلام
ART أفلام1
ART أفلام2
ART Cinema
ART حكايات
ART حكايات 2
Cinema 1
Cinema 2
Alfa Series Channel
Alfa Series +2
Al Yawm HD
Al Safwa
Fann
Music Now

Lifestyle & Factual:
OSN Mezze
OSN Living
OSN News
National Geographic
Nat Geo Wild HD
TLC
History
History 2
Discovery HD
Discovery Science
Investigation Discovery
Crime + Investigation
E!
MTV 00s
MTV Live HD
Sky News HD
Bloomberg Television
CNBC Europe

Pinoy (Philippines):
PBA Rush
TFC
DZMM TeleRadyo
Cinema One Global
GMA News TV International
GMA Life TV
GMA Pinoy TV
Cine Mo!
ABS-CBN News Channel
Myx TV
Kapatid TV5
DWRR 101.9

References

Further reading

External links 
 
 OSN+ (or OSN Plus)
 Company profile at Zawya
 Flysat OSN Package 
 Turner switch off on OSN

Telecommunications companies established in 2009
Mass media companies established in 2009
Direct broadcast satellite services
Mass media in Manama
Mass media companies of Bahrain
Television in Bahrain